The Louis Vuitton Trophy Nice Côte d’Azur was the first in a series of regattas that compete for the Louis Vuitton Trophy. The regatta was held in Nice between 7 and 22 November 2009. The Louis Vuitton Trophy format uses existing International America's Cup Class yachts loaned to the regatta by various America's Cup racing syndicates, keeping costs relatively low for the competing teams.

The Louis Vuitton Trophy was organised after the success of the Louis Vuitton Pacific Series and the continued legal battle surrounding the America's Cup yachting competition at the time.  Because of the long delays from the legal action, and the fact that the 2010 America's Cup became a Deed of Gift match without a defender or challenger selection series, the Louis Vuitton Trophy series was established as a competition for other America's Cup racing syndicates.

The Nice event was hosted by ALL4ONE Challenge and Club Nautique de Nice.

The Yachts

For the event Mascalzone Latino provided ITA-90 and ITA-99 while All4One and Team Origin loaned FRA-93 and GBR-75 respectively.

Teams
Eight teams participated in the Nice event. Despite loaning two boats to the event, Mascalzone Latino did not participate.

The Races

Round Robin One
7 November - 14 November
Up to four flights per day were scheduled through the conclusion of the round robin and lasted no longer than one hour in duration. The first three days were characterised by light winds and only two races were completed each day. However, on day four the race organisers completed four full flights (eight races) to get the regatta back on schedule.

A = Abandoned, P = Postponed, R = Retired

Round Robin Two
14 November-18 November
Stage 2 was a half round robin where the top four teams raced the bottom four teams. As the half round robin was not completed, teams received half points for matches sailed twice.

A = Abandoned, P = Postponed, R = Retired

Knock-Out Series
19 November-22 November
Stage 3 is the knockout semifinals and final.

Ranking Phase
Teams in the bottom half of the Round Robin will sail off for places 5-8.

Finals
As Team New Zealand won the Round Robin, they got to choose their Semi Final opponents from the top four. The first to score two wins will win each series. 
 
*Team New Zealand were penalised a point and Synergy was penalised half a point for failing to avoid a collision. Synergy were then further penalised half a point for not doing everything to keep clear in the same incident.

Junior Series
During the regatta forty junior French sailors competed in Open Bic boats. The winner received an Open Bic boat and a chance to be 18th man during the Trophy finals.

References

External links
 cupinfo.com
 www.louisvuittontrophy.com/home/ - Official Website

        
        
        
        
        

Louis Vuitton regattas
International America's Cup Class
2009 in sailing
Sailing competitions in France
2009 in French sport
November 2009 sports events in France